Grace Kesande Bataringaya (born 4 September 1970) is a Ugandan politician and member of parliament. In 2011, she was elected as a representative in parliament for Rubirizi district.

She is a member of the ruling National Resistance Movement political party.

Education 
She completed her primary level education in 1983 at Kyanamira primary school, In 1987 she completed her Uganda Certificate of Education (UCE) for lower secondary education at Hornyby girls secondary school in Kabale. She completed her advanced secondary level known as Uganda Advanced Certification of Education (UACE) in 1990 at Seseme girls secondary school in Kisoro. In 1993 she graduated from Makerere University with a bachelor's degree of Arts in Social science. in Kampala.

Other responsibilities 
She is a director in charge of Livelihood Community Volunteer Initiative for Development (COVOID), a local NGO operating in Rubirizi district.

References

National Resistance Movement politicians
Women members of the Parliament of Uganda
Members of the Parliament of Uganda
Rubirizi District
Makerere University alumni
Living people
1970 births
21st-century Ugandan women politicians
21st-century Ugandan politicians